This Kind of Punishment were a New Zealand post-punk band formed in Stratford in 1983.

History
The band was formed by brothers Peter and Graeme Jefferies, after the breakup of their post-punk outfit Nocturnal Projections. Their first self-titled album was recorded on 4-track recorder borrowed from Chris Knox, and released in an edition of 1000 on the Flying Nun label in 1983. It was reissued on the Roof Bolt label in 1998.

Their second album, A Beard of Bees, was recorded with an extended line-up, and self-released on vinyl in 1984. It was reissued on cassette by the Xpressway label in 1990, and again on CD by the Ajax label in the mid '90s.

In The Same Room, their third album, was released in 1987 by Flying Nun. It was reissued in 1993 by Ajax Records, and contained the tracks from their 5 By Four EP.

Discography

LPs
This Kind of Punishment (1983)
A Beard of Bees (1984)
In The Same Room (1987)

Singles & EPs
5 By Four (1985)

Compilations
 In The Same Room/5 By Four (1993)

References

New Zealand post-punk music groups
Flying Nun Records artists